Valerik (Valergthe)  is a rural locality (a selo) in Achkhoy-Martanovsky District, Chechnya.

Administrative and municipal status 
Municipally, Valerik is incorporated as Valerikskoye rural settlement. It is the administrative center of the municipality and the only settlement included in it.

Geography 

Valerik is located on both banks of the Valerik River.

The nearest settlements to Valerik are Zakan-Yurt in the north, Khambi-Irze and Kulary in the north-east, Gekhi in the east, Gekhi-Chu and Shalazhi in the south, Katyr-Yurt in the west, and Shaami-Yurt in the north-west.

History 
In 1944, after the genocide and deportation of the Chechen and Ingush people and the Chechen-Ingush ASSR was abolished, the village of Valerik was renamed and settled by other ethnic groups. From 1944 to 1957, it was a part of the Novoselsky District of Grozny Oblast.

In 1958, after the Vaynakh people returned and the Chechen-Ingush ASSR was restored, the village regained its old name, Valerik.

Population 
 1979 Census: 5,065
 1990 Census: 5,750 
 2002 Census: 6,012
 2010 Census: 8,023
 2019 estimate: 9,483

According to the results of the 2010 Census, the majority of residents of Valerik were ethnic Chechens.

Infrastructure 
Valerik hosts an elementary school, two secondary schools, and a local mosque.

References 

Rural localities in Achkhoy-Martanovsky District